The Flying Phantom Essentiel, (English: Essential), is a French hydrofoil catamaran sailing dinghy that was designed by Gonzalo Redondo and Martin Fischer and first built in 2017.

The Flying Phantom Essentiel is intended as an easier-to-sail hydrofoil for beginners than the Flying Phantom Elite. The company described the design goals as "an 18' all around boat easy to use, able to foil in a wide range of conditions and attract new people to foiling. This foil configuration makes the boat to be more user friendly and less physically demanding for the crew."

Production
The design was built by Phantom International in Dinard, France starting 2017, but the company ceased operations that same year and it is now out of production.

Design
The Flying Phantom Essentiel is a racing sailboat, built predominantly of an epoxy/glass sandwich. It has a fractional sloop rig, with an aluminum mast. The hulls have reverse-raked stems, vertical transoms, transom-hung rudders controlled by a tiller and retractable hydrofoils. It displaces .

The dual rudders are "L"-shaped, while the dual hydrofoil daggerboards are "L"-shaped. All are made from pre-preg, autoclave-cured carbon fibre.

The boat's mainsail and jib are made from polyester laminate, while the gennaker is polyester.

See also
List of sailing boat types
List of multihulls

Related development
Flying Phantom Elite

References

External links
Official website archives
Flying Phantom Essentiel video

Dinghies
2010s sailboat type designs
Two-person sailboats
Hydrofoil catamarans
Sailboat type designs by Martin Fischer
Sailboat type designs by Gonzalo Redondo
Sailboat types built by Phantom International